In statistics, the weighted geometric mean is a generalization of the geometric mean using the weighted arithmetic mean.

Given a sample  and weights , it is calculated as:

The second form above illustrates that the logarithm of the geometric mean is the weighted arithmetic mean of the logarithms of the individual values.
If all the weights are equal, the weighted geometric mean simplifies to the ordinary unweighted geometric mean.

See also
Average
Central tendency
Summary statistics
Weighted arithmetic mean
Weighted harmonic mean

External links
 Non-Newtonian calculus website

Means
Mathematical analysis

Non-Newtonian calculus